Magic Roundabout may refer to:

 The Magic Roundabout, a 1963 children's television series (originally Le Manège Enchanté)
The Magic Roundabout (film), a 2005 computer animated film, based on the series
 The Magic Roundabout, a 1979 project to build a full scale Millennium Falcon in Pembroke for a Star Wars film
A special traffic roundabout in England with a complex layout, nicknamed after the above series, also known as a ring junction:
Magic Roundabout (Colchester)
Magic Roundabout (Hemel Hempstead)
Magic Roundabout (High Wycombe)
Magic Roundabout (Swindon)
"Magic Roundabout", a song on IQ's 1985 album The Wake
"Magic Roundabout", a 1975 song by Jasper Carrott